Cape Hamelin is a headland seven kilometres south of Hamelin Bay in the capes region of south western Western Australia.

Except for Cape Leeuwin, it is the southernmost of over 1,000 kilometres of features named by the French in their travels along the coast.

Wrecks of ships have occurred within the vicinity of the cape.

The cape is in an area where crayfishing has been practised, and also where it has been restricted.

See also
 Cape Freycinet
 Cape Mentelle
 Cape Clairault

Notes

Hamelin
Hamelin Bay, Western Australia